The Roman Catholic Diocese of Goroka is  a suffragan diocese of the Roman Catholic Archdiocese of Mount Hagen based in Goroka. It was erected Vicariate Apostolic in 1959 and elevated to a diocese in 1966. In 1982, part of the diocese was separated to become the Diocese of Kundiawa.

Coat of arms 
The new coat of arms of the Diocese was adopted in 2016. The proposal of coat of arms was created by Marek Sobola, a heraldic specialist from Slovakia, who also made a coat of arms for former Bishop Dariusz Kałuża, MSF.

Bishops

Ordinaries
Bernard Schilling, S.V.D. (1959–1966) 
John Edward Cohill, S.V.D. (1966–1980) 
Raymond Rodly Caesar, S.V.D. (1980–1987) 
Michael Marai (1988–1994)
Francesco Sarego, S.V.D. (1995–2016) - presently Bishop Emeritus
Dariusz Kałuża, M.S.F. (2016–2020)
Walenty Gryk, S.V.D. (2022–present)

Coadjutor bishop
Raymond Rodly Caesar, S.V.D. (1978-1980)

External links and references

References

Goroka